The International Docking Adapter (IDA) is a spacecraft docking system adapter developed to convert APAS-95 to the NASA Docking System (NDS). An IDA is placed on each of the International Space Station's (ISS) two open Pressurized Mating Adapters (PMAs), both of which are connected to the Harmony module.

History
Prior to IDA there were several different iterations of docking adapters that were meant to fill a similar role but were ultimately canceled.

APAS to LIDS Adaptor System
The APAS to LIDS Adaptor System (ATLAS) was announced in 2008. It would have been placed on the open PMAs and converted APAS-95 to the Low Impact Docking System (LIDS). ATLAS was planned to be launched on Orion's first two missions to the International Space Station. Orion's missions to the ISS were later canceled altogether and its role as a crew transporter was replaced by the Commercial Crew Program.

Common Docking Adapter

The Common Docking Adapter (CDA) was announced in 2009. It was planned to be used to convert the Common Berthing Mechanism to the NASA Docking System. The CDAs would have been attached directly to Node-2 forward and Node-2 zenith. They would have been delivered on the Japanese HTV cargo spacecraft.

Design
IDA converts APAS-95 to the NASA Docking System (which complies with the International Docking System Standard) and allows the transfer of crew, cargo, power and data.

Boeing is the primary contractor for the IDAs and the adapters were assembled at their Houston Product Support Center. Parts from subcontractors came from 25 American states and the primary structure is from Russian company RSC Energia.

Deployment of IDA modules
It then moved the IDA carefully into position until it was seated on the PMA and held it there. Astronauts during an Extravehicular activity then completed the electrical connections and permanently connect it to the PMA.

IDA-1 was planned to be attached to Node-2's forward PMA. IDA-2 was originally planned to be attached to Node-2's zenith PMA. But following the loss of IDA-1, IDA-2 was instead attached to Node-2's forward PMA (PMA-2). IDA-3, a replacement for IDA-1, is installed at Node-2's zenith PMA (PMA-3).

IDA-1

In February 2015, IDA-1 had been transported to the Kennedy Space Center while IDA-2 was still at Boeing's Houston facility. The systems and targets for IDA-1 were put through about a month of tests at the Space Station Processing Facility before being loaded for launch.

IDA-1 was lost during the launch failure of SpaceX CRS-7 on 28 June 2015.

IDA-2

IDA-2 was launched on SpaceX CRS-9 on 18 July 2016. It was attached and connected to PMA-2 during a spacewalk on 19 August 2016. First docking was achieved with the arrival of Crew Dragon Demo-1 on 3 March 2019.

IDA-3
IDA-3 was launched on the SpaceX CRS-18 mission in July 2019. IDA-3 is constructed mostly from spare parts to speed construction. It was attached and connected to PMA-3 during a spacewalk on 21 August 2019. First docking was achieved with the arrival of SpaceX CRS-21 on 7 December 2020.

Gallery

See also
Comparison of spacecraft docking and berthing mechanisms

References 

Spacecraft components
Spacecraft docking systems
2015 in spaceflight
Components of the International Space Station